Sea Cliff (sometimes spelled Seacliff) is a neighborhood in northwestern San Francisco, California. It is known for its large houses and ocean views. Sea Cliff is one of eight master–planned residence parks in San Francisco; its master plan was developed by landscape architect Mark Daniels. Sea Cliff has become one of San Francisco's most elite residential areas.

Location
It is adjacent to the Pacific Ocean and Baker Beach, southwest of the Presidio of San Francisco, and east of Lincoln Park.

Characteristics

Houses in the Sea Cliff neighborhood are large and many offer views of the Pacific Ocean, the Golden Gate Bridge, and the Marin Headlands. A small public beach named China Beach and the national park Land's End are located in the neighborhood.

There are several buildings in Sea Cliff by notable architects:

 9, 25 and 45 Scenic Way, built in 1914, Architect Willis Polk (1867–1924)
 The Hanson House at 126 27th Avenue, built in 1907, Architect John Charles Flugger (1865–1930)
 50 Scenic Way, built in 1921 for Maude Strowbridge, Architect Julia Morgan (1872–1957)
 60 Mclaren and 455 Sea Cliff, Albert L. Farr (?– 1947)
 8 Sea Cliff Avenue, Architect Edward G. Bowles (1871-1939).

Residents 
Sea Cliff contains the  residences for the consul generals of Switzerland, South Korea, The Netherlands.

Some of the neighborhood's more famous current and past residents include: 

 Ansel Adams, photographer 
 Larry Baer, San Francisco Giants CEO
 Luke Brugnara, real estate tycoon 
 Jack Dorsey, founder of Twitter and Square, Inc. 
 Donald Fisher, Gap founder 
 Kevin Gausman, former San Francisco Giants pitcher
 Eileen Gu, freestyle skier
 Kirk Hammett, Metallica guitarist 
 Paul Kantner, Jefferson Airplane guitarist
 Eugene Levy, actor
 Cheech Marin, actor
 Clinton Reilly, real estate mogul
 Linda Ronstadt, singer 
 Walter Shorenstein, real estate investor
 George Soros, hedge fund investor 
 Tom Steyer, hedge fund manager and 2020 Presidential Candidate  
 Sharon Stone, actress
 Robin Williams, comic actor

See also

49–Mile Scenic Drive

References

Neighborhoods in San Francisco
Richmond District, San Francisco
Populated coastal places in California
Upper class culture in the United States